Santos Futebol Clube ( Santos Football Club), also known as Santos  and familiarly as Peixe, is a Brazilian professional judo club, based in Santos, Brazil. 

Santos FC have judo as one of their sports since 1968. In late 2006, the club has partnered with the Associação de Judô Rogério Sampaio (AJRS), led by Olympic champion, who is deputy director of Santos FC. One of the biggest academies in the country in the sport, the athletes at AJRS has experienced and also performs the preparation of young athletes who play the amateur categories. Training is delivered by quality teachers, as the former coach of the Brazilian Ivo Nascimento. The AJRS has among its students no less than nine members of the Brazilian Judo - Andressa Fernandes, Mariana Santos Silva, Maria Suellen Altheman, Bruno Mendonça, Leandro Gonçalves Felipe Cesar Camilo de Oliveira, the senior, Raphael and Daniel Ribeiro Zavarizi Warzee Placido de Sousa, in Junior, and Beatriz Santos de Oliveira, the Juvenile. 

The Academy of Rogério Sampaio also was instrumental in the formation and preparation of the judo world-renowned names such as Leandro Guilheiro, holder of two bronze medals at the Olympics, and Danielle Zangrando, the first Brazilian to climb the podium in a World Championship.

References

External links
 Official website

Sports clubs established in 1912
Judo in Brazil
Santos FC
Judo organizations
1912 establishments in Brazil